The Beach Boys in Concert is the third live album by the American rock band the Beach Boys, released in November 1973. It was their first live album since Beach Boys Concert (1964), as well as the only live album and the final album on which Blondie Chaplin and Ricky Fataar appeared as official members.

Reception

The Beach Boys in Concert gave the band their best chart peak since 1967's Wild Honey by reaching number 25, and earning them their first gold record since 1966's Best of The Beach Boys.

Track listing

Personnel
The Beach Boys
Carl Wilson – lead guitar, electric piano, vocals
Dennis Wilson – electric piano, vocals
Al Jardine – rhythm guitar, vocals
Mike Love – vocals
Blondie Chaplin – guitar, vocals
Ricky Fataar – drums, vocals

Additional personnel
Ed Carter – bass
Billy Hinsche – guitar, keyboards
Robert Kenyatta – percussion
Mike Kowalski – drums, percussion
Carli Muñoz – keyboards

References

The Beach Boys live albums
1973 live albums
Capitol Records live albums
Reprise Records live albums
Brother Records live albums
Albums produced by the Beach Boys